Villa del Campo – Town of the Country – is a neighborhood in Baja California in Tijuana Municipality. The neighborhood had a population of 13,906 as of 2010.

See also

References

External links

Populated places in Tijuana Municipality